Apeiba is a genus of shrubs or trees in the family Malvaceae. It is native to tropical America.

Taxonomy
The following species are currently recognized:
 Apeiba albiflora Ducke
 Apeiba discolor (Spreng.) G.Don
 Apeiba glabra Aubl.
 Apeiba intermedia Uittien
 Apeiba macropetala Ducke
 Apeiba membranacea Spruce ex Benth.
 Apeiba petoumo Aubl.
 Apeiba schomburgkii Szyszył.
 Apeiba tibourbou Aubl.
 Apeiba uittienii Jans.-Jac. & Westra

References

 
Malvaceae genera
Taxonomy articles created by Polbot
Taxa named by Jean Baptiste Christian Fusée-Aublet